Louis J. Panella (1881 – March 13, 1940) was an American musician, composer, and teacher.  He wrote many popular songs, both music and lyrics, and many pieces for concert bands.  He was the brother of Frank Panella.  Louis Panella played trumpet with the Pittsburgh Symphony Orchestra and taught trumpet at the Carnegie Institute of Technology (now Carnegie-Mellon University).  His best known composition is a concert band march, American Red Cross.

Partial list of songs
My Sunshine Rosie Rose (1911)
Love Tokens (1911) 
That Spooky Rag (1912) Words: Geo E Roesch
Echoes of the Chimes (1914) 
Pansy Blossoms (1915) 
At the Dance (1915) 
Wedding Day (1915) 
Carolina Lullaby (1921) `Words by: Walter Hirsch
The Pitt Panther (1923) Hail to Pitt Words: Howard E. Reppert
Moonbeams (1924)
Dance of the Kewpies (1926) 
The Woodpecker (1926) 
An Old Familiar Song (1931) a tribute to Stephen Collins Foster, Lyrics by Devolco C. Potter

Partial list of works for band
1902 Allegiance to the Flag
1907 Fighting Chance
1911 Civic Pride
1918 American Red Cross March
1919 With the Colors
1922 The Pitt Panther
1924 In Command March
1924 The University of Dayton,  Loyalty March
1932 Amerita
1932 The Junior
1933 Alhambra festival, overture
Freshman
Knights of Chivalry
Master Melodies Overture
Overture of Overtures
Senior
Sophomore
Venus

References

External links
 Find a Grave page
 Carolina Lullaby sheet music
 American Red Cross performed
 Civic Pride sheet music

1881 births
1940 deaths
American male composers
American composers
20th-century American male musicians